Dromore Castle may refer to:
 Dromore Castle (County Clare), near Ruan
 Dromore Castle (County Kerry), near Templenoe
 Dromore Castle (County Limerick), a ruined castle in Ireland near Pallaskenry